Narayan Prasad Adhikari (Nepali: नारायण प्रसाद अधिकारी) is a Nepalese politician, belonging to the CPN (Maoist). In the 2008 Constituent Assembly election he was elected from the Pyuthan-1 constituency, winning 13,096 votes.

References

Living people
Communist Party of Nepal (Maoist Centre) politicians
Nepalese atheists
Year of birth missing (living people)
Members of the 1st Nepalese Constituent Assembly